Monostorapáti is a village in Veszprém county, Hungary.

A monastery was founded there in 1121.

External links 
 Street map 

Populated places in Veszprém County